Santé Marcuzzi (6 April 1934 – 23 December 2020) was a French rower.

Marcuzzi was born in 1934. He competed at the 1956 European Rowing Championships in Bled, Yugoslavia, with the men's eight where they won the silver medal. The same team went to the 1956 Summer Olympics in Melbourne with the men's eight where they were eliminated in the round one heat.

References

External links
 

1934 births
2020 deaths
French male rowers
Olympic rowers of France
Rowers at the 1956 Summer Olympics
European Rowing Championships medalists